IDEC may refer to:

Biogen Idec, a biotechnology company
IDEC Corporation, a Japanese manufacturer of automation and control products
International Democratic Education Conference, an annual academic and youth conference 
Toralizumab (IDEC 131), an antibody and an immunosuppressive drug
The sponsor name given to ocean racing trimarans skippered by French yachtsman Francis Joyon:
, a 75ft trimaran built in 1985
IDEC 2, a 97ft trimaran built in 2007
IDEC 3, a 103ft trimaran built in 2006